Viktor Klimov (born 10 December 1964) is a Soviet and Ukrainian former cyclist. He competed in the team time trial at the 1988 Summer Olympics.

Major results

1984
 1st  Team time trial, Soviet National Road Championships
 2nd Overall Tour of Bulgaria
1985
 1st  Team time trial, UCI Road World Championships
 1st Stage 2 (TTT) Peace Race
 2nd Overall Settimana Ciclistica Bergamasca
1st Stage 1
1986
 1st  Team time trial, Soviet National Road Championships
 1st Stage 3 (TTT) Peace Race
1987
 Soviet National Road Championships
1st  Duo time trial (with Vasily Zhdanov)
1st  Team time trial
 2nd  Team time trial, UCI Road World Championships
 2nd Overall Settimana Ciclistica Bergamasca
1st Stage 2
1988
 1st  Team time trial, Soviet National Road Championships
1989
 Soviet National Road Championships
1st  Road race
1st  Team time trial
 1st Stage 1 Vuelta a Cuba
 3rd  Team time trial, UCI Road World Championships
1990
 5th Firenze–Pistoia
1991
 1st Overall Troféu Joaquim Agostinho
 1st Memorial Manuel Galera
 1st Stage 4 Paris–Nice
 1st Stage 5 Tour of Galicia
 3rd Trofeo Comunidad Foral de Navarra
 7th Overall Vuelta a los Valles Mineros
 7th Grand Prix La Marseillaise
1992
 3rd Overall Vuelta a La Rioja
 3rd Trofeo Comunidad Foral de Navarra
1993
 3rd Memorial Manuel Galera

Grand Tour general classification results timeline

References

External links
 

1964 births
Living people
Soviet male cyclists
Ukrainian male cyclists
Olympic cyclists of the Soviet Union
Cyclists at the 1988 Summer Olympics
Sportspeople from Simferopol